Gabriel Airton de Souza (born 29 March 1996), known as Gabrielzinho, is a Brazilian footballer who plays for Al Wasl as a winger.

Career statistics

References

External links

1996 births
Living people
Brazilian footballers
Brazilian expatriate footballers
Association football forwards
Campeonato Brasileiro Série D players
Primeira Liga players
UAE Pro League players
Clube Atlético Linense players
Rio Ave F.C. players
Moreirense F.C. players
Al-Wasl F.C. players
Brazilian expatriate sportspeople in Portugal
Brazilian expatriate sportspeople in the United Arab Emirates
Expatriate footballers in Portugal
Expatriate footballers in the United Arab Emirates